Rain Tree Crow is the sole album released by English band Rain Tree Crow, a reunion project by the members of the new wave band Japan. Recorded in 1989 and 1990 and released in April 1991, it was the first time that members David Sylvian, Mick Karn, Steve Jansen and Richard Barbieri had collaborated as a four-piece since 1982. The album peaked at number 24 on the UK Albums Chart.

Background
The name Rain Tree Crow was chosen to mark a break from Japan's past, with the intention of creating a new long-term project. As the music turned out to be less commercial than originally envisaged, all members of the band aside from Sylvian became amenable to the idea of retaining the Japan moniker, in order to gain maximum exposure. Virgin Records pressured the musicians to let them market the album under the name Japan; however, Sylvian was adamant that this would not take place. Sylvian's opinion prevailed and the album was released as by Rain Tree Crow.

It was decided early on that the project would involve only group compositions, as opposed to the group's earlier modus operandi where songs were largely based on Sylvian's ideas.

According to Karn, "the whole concept and direction of that album was that it was going to be very pop-oriented", wanting "to surprise people by doing the unexpected—by coming back into a market which we'd left behind a very long time ago. So, we decided that we would have a new name— Rain Tree Crow. The more obscure the name, the better. We believed that it would be a long-term project and that the name Rain Tree Crow would become more important than the name Japan".

There had initially been talk about doing a second or third album, and possibly touring, but ultimately, personalities clashed toward the end of the project, with Sylvian citing differences of opinion, money and the re-emergence of "old tensions and frustrations".

Recording 
The two main studios used for recording were Miraval in the South of France, chosen particularly for its ambient live rooms and Condulmer near Venice. Four to five weeks recording at each location produced the bulk of the material. The principle notion behind the project was to leave the tape rolling and see what transpired in the extempore sessions. This concept of impromptu performances represented a sharp contrast to the ways in which the group had originally worked.  It was the last time all four group members collaborated, but it laid the groundwork for other related projects. In particular, Jansen Barbieri Karn, also known as JBK, emerged afterwards.

In an interview in 2009, Sylvian said:

Release and reception 

"Blackwater" was released as the album's only single and reached number 62 in the UK Singles Chart in March 1991. The album reached number 24 in the UK Albums Chart.

The album was remastered and reissued on CD in 2003. The B-side track from the "Blackwater" single, "I Drink To Forget", was included on this reissue, but omitted on the later vinyl reissue of March 2019.

Track listing

Personnel
Rain Tree Crow
 David Sylvian – vocals (1–3, 5, 6, 8, 10, 12), electric guitar (1, 2, 5–8, 10–12), organ (1, 5, 9, 10), electric piano (1, 2, 10), shortwave radio (1, 2), horn arrangement (1), treatments (2, 10, 12), percussion (3, 9, 13), slide guitar (4), synthesizers (4, 8–10, 13), Indian drum (4), bass (7), banjo (11), marimba (11), harmonium (11), prepared piano (13)
 Mick Karn – bass (1, 2, 4, 5, 8, 10, 12), brass (1, 5), horn arrangement (1), saxophone (2, 10), pipes (3), tabla (4), bass clarinet (7, 9, 11), percussion (9), wine glasses (13)
 Steve Jansen – drums (1, 2, 5, 8, 10), percussion (2–5, 8–10, 12, 13), ceramic drums (4), additional organ (5), tambourine (6), Moroccan clay drums (7), fan drums (7), marimba (9, 11), piano (11), wine glasses (13)
 Richard Barbieri – synthesizers (1–13), piano (9), water wheel (11)

Additional musicians
 Bill Nelson – electric guitar (1, 8, 10)
 Djene Doumbouya – vocals (1)
 Djanka Djabate – vocals (1)
The Phantom Horns:
Johnny Thirkell – trumpet/flugelhorn (1)
Gary Barnacle – saxophones (1)
Phil Palmer – slide guitar (2), acoustic guitar (4)
Michael Brook – bass conga (4), treatments (5, 11), percussion (9), Infinite Guitar (10)
Brian Gascoigne – orchestration (4)

Technical
David Sylvian – art director, mixing (1–13)
Pat McCarthy – engineering, mixing (2, 3, 6, 7, 11)
Steve Nye – mixing (1, 4, 5, 8–10, 12)
Al Stone – assistant mixing (1, 4, 5, 8–10, 12)
Shinya Fujiwara – cover photography
Russell Mills – design
Yuka Fujii – art director
Tim Martin – additional engineering
Paolo Carrer – assistant
Rupert Coulson – assistant
Louise McCormick – assistant
Bruce Davies – assistant
Paul Stevens – assistant
Richard Chadwick – co-ordinator
Tony Cousins – reissue remastering

Charts

References

External links 
 

Japan (band) albums
1991 debut albums
David Sylvian albums
Virgin Records albums